V. Ramarathnam (1917–2008) was a Carnatic musician, author, teacher and composer known under the mudra Rama. His career spanned approximately 70 years until his death in 2008.

He studied under Sangeetha Rathna Mysore Chowdiah, and later became the first Principal of the University College of Music and Dance in Mysore, a position which he held until his retirement in 1987. During his career he composed around 25 kritis in well known ragas in Sanskrit, Telugu and Kannada. He also wrote or co-wrote thirteen books about the theoretical and practical aspects of Carnatic music. Ten of these books have been published by the University Press at the University of Mysore.

Published books
Sangeetha Darpana, University of Mysore, Prasaranga Publication, 1969
Karnataka Sangeetha Sudha, co-written with Dr. V.S. Sampathkumaracharya, University of Mysore, Prasaranga Publication, 1967
Sangeetha Ratna T. Chowdiah's Compositions, Published by University of Mysore, 1975
Sangeetha Shastra Parichaya Vols 1 and 2, co-written with R.N. Doraiswamy
Karnataka Sangeetha Krithirachana Sangraha Volume 1,  1992.
Pallaki Seva Prabhandham, co-written with M.V. Rathna, University of Mysore, Prasaranga, 1974.
Noukacharithram, co-written with R.N. Doraiswamy, 1969.
Karnataka Sangeethadha Lakshya Lakshana Sangraha, Published by University of Mysore, Prasaranga.
Mysore Sadhashivarayaru, Published by Karnataka Sangeetha Nrithya Academy, Bangalore 1997.
Karnataka Sangeetha Deepeke, co-written with Dr. V.S. Sampathkumaracharya, Published by D.V.K. Murthy, Mysore, 2000.
Keerthana Tharangini- published by D.V.K. Murthy, Mysore, 2000.
Contribution and Patronage of Mysore Wodeyars to Carnatic Music, Published by Kannada Book Authority, Bangalore, India
Apurva Vaggeya Kruthimanjari, Published by D.V.K. Murthy, 2004
Muthuswami Dikshithara Navagraha Krithigalu, Published by D.V.K. Murthy, 2004
Muthuswami Dikshithara NavaVarna Krithigalu, Published by D.V.K. Murthy, 2004
Reminiscence of a Musician - Released as part of Prof. Ramarathnam's 90th Birthday Celebration in December 2006.
Apurva Vaggeya Kruthimanjari (Vol ii), released in 2007
Padams and Javali's, released in 2009

See also
Carnatic Music

References

1917 births
2008 deaths
Musicians from Andhra Pradesh
Carnatic instrumentalists
Male Carnatic singers
Carnatic singers
Academic staff of the University of Mysore
Indian music educators
20th-century Indian male classical singers
20th-century Indian composers
People from Chittoor district